Brian Doyle may refer to:

Brian J. Doyle (born 1950), former press secretary of the US Department of Homeland Security
Brian Doyle (baseball) (born 1954), former Major League Baseball infielder
Brian Doyle (Canadian writer) (born 1935), Canadian writer
Brian Doyle (rower) (1930–2008), Australian rower who competed in the 1956 Summer Olympics
Brian Doyle (footballer) (1930–1992), footballer and manager
Brian Doyle (Wexford hurler) (born 1991), Irish hurler for Shelmaliers and Wexford
Brian Doyle (Carlow hurler) (born 1989), Irish hurler for Erin's Own and Carlow
Brian Andre Doyle (1911–2004), Solicitor-General of Fiji, 1948–1951
Brian Doyle (rugby union) (born 1984), American rugby union player
Brian Doyle (American writer) (1956–2017), American writer and editor of Portland Magazine
 Brian Doyle, Canadian criminal convicted for the murder of Catherine Carroll

See also
Brian Doyle-Murray (born 1945), comedian and actor
Bryan Doyle (born 1963), Australian politician
Bryan Doyle (cricketer) (born 1968), Australian former cricketer